The Cerro Tilarán Volcano is an andesitic shield volcano in Costa Rica.

References 

Mountains of Costa Rica
Volcanoes of Costa Rica
Pleistocene shield volcanoes